The 2012–13 NCAA Division I women's ice hockey season will begin in October, 2011, and ended with the 2013 NCAA Division I Women's Ice Hockey Tournament's championship game in March, 2013.

Offseason
May 31: Taylor Gross has been named captain for the Penn State Nittany Lions in their inaugural NCAA Division I season.

Transfers

Exhibition

CIS Exhibition

PWHL Exhibition

News and notes

September

October

November

December

January

February

Regular season

Season standings

Awards and honors

Patty Kazmaier Award finalists
Amanda Kessel, Winner, Minnesota Golden Gophers
Megan Bozek, Minnesota Golden Gophers
Noora Raty, Minnesota Golden Gophers

AHCA Coach of the Year
 Brad Frost, Minnesota

All-America selections

First team
 Forward, Brianne Jenner, 2012-13 First Team All-America selection
 Forward, Amanda Kessel, 2012-13 First Team All-America selection 
 Forward, Jocelyne Lamoureux, 2012-13 First Team All-America selection 
 Defense, Monique Lamoureux-Kolls, 2012-13 First Team All-America selection 
Defense, Megan Bozek, 2012-13 First Team All-America selection 
Goaltender, Noora Raty, 2012-13 First Team All-America selection

Second team
 Forward, Alex Carpenter, 2012-13 Second Team All-America selection 
Forward, Kendall Coyne, 2012-13 Second Team All-America selection 
Forward, Brianna Decker, 2012-13 Second Team All-America selection 
Defense, Blake Bolden, 2012-13 Second Team All-America selection 
Defense, Lauriane Rougeau, 2012-13 Second Team All-America selection 
Goaltender, Alex Rigsby, 2012-13 Second Team All-America selection

See also
National Collegiate Women's Ice Hockey Championship
2012–13 CHA women's ice hockey season
2012–13 ECAC women's ice hockey season
2012–13 Hockey East women's ice hockey season
2012–13 WCHA women's ice hockey season

References

 
NCAA
NCAA
NCAA
NCAA Division I women's ice hockey seasons